The Texas A&M Aggies women's soccer team represents Texas A&M University in NCAA Division I college soccer. The Aggies are currently led by G. Guerrieri, who has been the head coach since the program's inception in 1993.

The 2014 team has 22 roster players, with 14 scholarships to utilize between them.  The 2014 team finished first in the SEC in its third year as a member of the conference.  The team advanced to its 20th consecutive NCAA Tournament, where they eventually lost to Virginia in the program's first appearance in the College Cup.

History
Click on year for individual team pages

Individual Honors

All-Americans
Highest achievement listed for each year

Big 12 Player of the Year

Big 12 Coach of the Year

Honda Sports Award (Soccer)

Lowe's Senior CLASS Award

References

External links

 

 
1993 establishments in Texas
NCAA Division I women's soccer teams